The 2012 FIBA Women's European Championship for Small Countries was the 12th edition of this competition. The tournament took place in Ohrid, Republic of Macedonia, from 10 to 15 July 2012. Austria women's national basketball team won the tournament for the fourth time.

Venue
Biljanini Izvori Sports Hall

Participating teams

First round
In the first round, the teams were drawn into two groups of four. The first two teams from each group advance to the semifinals, the other teams will play in the 5th–8th place playoffs.

Group A

Group B

5th–8th place playoffs

5th–8th place semifinals

7th place match

5th place match

Championship playoffs

Semifinals

3rd place match

Final

Final standings

References

FIBA Women's European Championship for Small Countries
Small Countries
International sports competitions hosted by North Macedonia
Basketball in North Macedonia
July 2012 sports events in Europe